No Shouts, No Calls is the fourth album by English rock group Electrelane. It was released on CD and LP in 2007 by Too Pure.

No Shouts, No Calls is also their first album to be entirely digitally recorded and mixed. The group began writing material in Berlin's Planet Roc studios in the summer of 2006, at the height of the World Cup. During that period, the band became fans of the sport, going so far as to rearrange their recording schedules around the event and including a sample of a match between Hertha BSC Berlin and FC Moskva in the song "Five" of their new album.

In September and October, they were at Key Recording in Benton Harbor recording and mixing their album. In November, the band announced on their official website that they had finished recording and had titled their album No Shouts, No Calls. The album was released in on 23 April 2007 in Japan, 3 May 2007 in the USA and 30 April 2007 elsewhere. The first single, titled "To the East," was released on 12 March 2007. The album received generally positive reviews, with Heather Phares of Allmusic calling some songs "among the band's finest work"; detractors included
Leonie Cooper of The Guardian, who mentioned the band had a "penchant for turning every tune [into] a proggy wig-out." James Reed of the Boston Globe picked the album as one of the best of 2007. The name “No Shouts, No Calls” is a reference to a line from the 2003 film “Master and Commander: The Far Side of the World."

Track listing 

All songs written by Electrelane and Verity Susman, except where noted.

 "The Greater Times" (Electrelane) – 3:42
 "To the East" – 4:54
 "After the Call" – 3:04
 "Tram 21" – 4:30
 "In Berlin" – 4:14
 "At Sea" – 4:47
 "Between the Wolf and the Dog" – 4:05
 "Saturday" – 3:55
 "Five" – 6:25
 "Cut and Run" – 3:27
 "The Lighthouse" – 4:22

The Japanese release contains the following bonus tracks:
 "Carolina Wren"
 "Sea of the Edge"

Personnel 
 Verity Susman – guitar, keyboards, vocals
 Emma Gaze – drums
 Mia Clarke – guitar, vocals
 Ros Murray – organ, bass, cello, ukulele, vocals
 Jessica Ruffins – engineer, mixing
 Bill Skibbe – engineer, mixing
 Steve Rooke – mastering

Release history

References

External links 
  – provided by Too Pure through YouTube

2007 albums
Electrelane albums
Too Pure albums